The name José María Leyva may refer to:

 José María Bonifacio Leiva Peres, also known as Cajemé
 José María Leyva, an insurgent leader in the Mexican Revolution